The Eastern New England League was a minor league baseball league that played in the 1885 season. League teams were based in Maine and Massachusetts. The league evolved into the New England League in 1886.

History
The Eastern New England League began play in 1885 with five teams in Massachusetts and Maine. The five charter teams were Lawrence, Haverhill, Biddleford/Newburyport, Portland and Brockton, with Lawrence winning the 1885 championship. The league continued play and shortened its name after the 1885 season.

The five–team league schedule consisted of an 80 game season, with each team playing 20 games against each of the other four. On July 17, 1885, the Biddeford Clamdiggers had a record of 13–20 when the franchise disbanded and was replaced by Newburyport, Massachusetts to complete the season.

Lawrence ended the 1885 season with a 50–31 record, finishing 2.0 games ahead of 2nd place Brockton, as the league held no playoff.

The newly named "New England League" played its first game in 1886, with the same five Eastern New England League clubs plus the addition of the Boston Blues as a sixth team. The first New England League champion was the Portland club.

Baseball Hall of Fame member Frank Selee managed the 1885 Haverhill team.

Cities represented
Biddeford, ME: Biddeford Clamdiggers 1885
Brockton, MA: Brockton 1885
Haverhill, MA: Haverhill 1885
Lawrence, MA: Lawrence 1885
Newburyport, MA: Newburyport Clamdiggers 1885
Portland, ME: Portland 1985

Standings and statistics
1885 Eastern New England League
Biddeford (13–20) disbanded July 17, replaced by Newburyport July 25.

References

Defunct minor baseball leagues in the United States
Baseball leagues in Maine
Baseball leagues in Massachusetts
Sports leagues established in 1885
Sports leagues disestablished in 1885